The Movietone sound system is an optical sound-on-film method of recording sound for motion pictures that guarantees synchronization between sound and picture. It achieves this by recording the sound as a variable-density optical track on the same strip of film that records the pictures. The initial version was capable of a frequency response of 8500 Hz. Although sound films today use variable-area tracks, any modern motion picture theater (excluding those that have transitioned to digital cinema) can play a Movietone film without modification to the projector (though if the projector's sound unit has been fitted with red LED or laser light sources, the reproduction quality from a variable density track will be significantly impaired). Movietone was one of four motion picture sound systems under development in the U.S. during the 1920s, the others being DeForest Phonofilm, Warner Brothers' Vitaphone, and RCA Photophone, though Phonofilm was primarily an early version of Movietone.

History
As a student, Theodore Case became interested in the use of modulated light to carry speech, and in 1916 set up a laboratory to study the photo-electric properties of materials.  He developed the Thalofide cell, a sensitive photocell, which was used as part of an infrared communication system by the U.S. Navy during, and for some years after WW1.

In 1922 Case and his assistant Earl I. Sponable turned their attention to "talking pictures". In that same year Case was approached by Lee de Forest who had been attempting since 1919 to create an optical soundtrack for motion picture film in a system he called Phonofilm. De Forest was having little success and turned to Case for help, so from 1922 until 1925 Case and de Forest collaborated in the development of the Phonofilm system. Amongst other Case inventions Case contributed the Thalofide photocell and also the Aeo-light, a light source that could be readily modulated by audio signals and was used to expose the soundtrack in sound cameras.

In 1925, however, Case ended his relationship with de Forest due to de Forest's tendency to claim the entire credit for the Phonofilm system for himself despite the fact that most of the critical inventions had come from Case. Documents supporting this, including a signed letter by De Forest that states that Phonofilms are only possible because of the inventions of Case Research Lab, are located at the Case Research Lab Museum in Auburn, New York. In 1925, therefore, Case and Sponable continued the development of their own system, now called "Movietone".

From 1924 onwards Sponable had turned his attention to the design of single-system cameras, in which the sound and picture are recorded on the same negative. He asked Bell & Howell to modify one of their cameras to his design, but the results were unsatisfactory. Consequently, the Wall machine shop in Syracuse, New York was asked to rebuild this camera and the results were much improved.

Subsequently, many single-system 35mm cameras were produced by Wall Camera Corporation, which much later produced the three-film Cinerama cameras. Wall initially converted some Bell & Howell Design 2709 cameras to single-system, but most were Wall designed and produced. Single-system cameras were also produced by Mitchell Camera Corporation during World War II for the U.S. Army Signal Corps, although these cameras were quite rare.

Partly as a result of the single system experiments, the aspect ratio of approximately 1.19:1 that is created by printing an optical soundtrack on top of the 35mm full aperture became known colloquially as the "Movietone ratio".  It was used extensively by Hollywood and European studios (apart from those that adopted sound-on-disc) between the late 1920s and May 1932, when the Academy ratio of 1.37:1 was introduced to restore the effective shape of the silent frame.

The 1950s brought the first 35mm kinescope camera with sound-on-film rather than separate, from Photo-Sonics, with a Davis Loop Drive mechanism built within the camera box. This camera was essential for TV network time-shifting in the years before Videotape. The sound galvanometer was made by RCA and was designed for good to excellent results when the kinescope negative was projected, thereby avoiding making a print before the delayed replay. The Davis mechanism was a Western Electric development.

After the split with de Forest, Case adopted a revised position for the projector soundhead, which was now placed below the picture head, with a sound-picture offset of 14 ½ inches (368 mm) (which is close to the present day standard), rather than being placed above the picture head as had been the phonofilm practice. Case also adopted the 24 frames/sec speed for Movietone, bringing it in line with the speed already chosen for the Western Electric Vitaphone sound-on-disc system, and thus establishing 24 frames/sec as the standard speed for all sound films, whether sound-on-disc or sound-on-film. With a few exceptions, this has remained the standard speed for professional sound films ever since.

At this point, the Movietone system was adopted by the AMPAS as the Academy's standard. It and the later RCA Photophone system were interchangeable in most respects. See RCA Photophone for technical details and lists of the industry adopters.

Commercial use by William Fox
Movietone entered commercial use when William Fox of the Fox Film Corporation bought the entire system including the patents in July 1926. Although Fox owned the Case patents, the work of Freeman Harrison Owens, and the American rights to the German Tri-Ergon patents, the Movietone sound film system uses only the inventions of Case Research Lab.

William Fox hired Earl I. Sponable (1895–1977) from Case Research Lab in 1926, when he purchased the sound-on-film patents from Case. The first feature film released using the Fox Movietone system was Sunrise: A Song of Two Humans (1927) directed by F. W. Murnau. It was the first professionally produced feature film with an optical sound track. The sound in the film included only music, sound effects, and very few unsynchronized words. The system was used for sound acting sequences in Mother Knows Best (1928).

Less than two years after purchasing the system from Case, Fox bought out all of Case's interests in the Fox-Case company. All of Fox's sound feature films were made using the Movietone system until 1931 when it was superseded by a Western Electric recording system using the light-valve invented by Edward C. Wente in 1923. However, Fox Movietone News used the system until 1939, because of the ease of transporting the single-system's sound film equipment.

Later development

The Case Research Lab sound system influenced many industry standards, such as location of the optical sound 20 frames in advance of the image it accompanies.  The current SMPTE standard for 35 mm sound film is +21 frames for optical, but a 46-foot theatre reduces this to +20 frames; this was originally done partly to ensure the film runs smoothly past the sound head, but also to ensure that no Phonofilm could again be played in theaters — the Phonofilm system being incompatible with Case Research Lab specifications — and also to ease the modification of projectors already widely in use.

Sponable worked at the Fox Film Corporation (later 20th Century Fox) Movietone studios on 54th Street and 10th Avenue in New York City until he retired in the 1960s, eventually winning an Academy Award for his technical work on the development of CinemaScope. Sponable had many contributions to film technology during his career, including the invention of the perforated motion-picture screen that allowed placing the speakers behind it to enhance the illusion of the sound emanating directly from the film action. During his years at Fox, Sponable also served for a time as an officer of the Society of Motion Picture and Television Engineers. He published a concise history of sound film in the April 1947 issue of The SMPE Journal (The SMPTE Journal after 1950).

The history of Case Research Lab has long been unheralded for numerous reasons. Theodore Case died in 1944, after donating his home and laboratory to be preserved as a museum to the inventions of Case Research Lab. The museum's first director, who oversaw the museum for 50 years, put the laboratory's contents into storage and converted the building into an art studio. The Case Research Lab sound studio was located on the second floor of the estate's carriage house and that was rented to the local model train club until the early 1990s.

Fox was seriously injured in a July 1929 car accident, lost his company in 1930 when his loans were called in and lost the 1936 lawsuit in the U.S. Supreme Court against the film industry for violating the Tri-Ergon patents he owned. Sponable did little to establish the record of Case Research Lab inventions, other than his April 1947 article in The Journal of the SMPE.

Incredibly, it was also in 1947 that the Davis Loop Drive was first introduced to Western Electric licensees, including Twentieth Century-Fox (WECo RA-1231; and still made to this day by a successor company). 

Recently, Case Research Lab, the adjoining carriage house, and Case's home have been restored and research is ongoing with the collections of the lab that include all receipts, notebooks, correspondence, and much of the laboratory's original equipment, including the first recording device created to test the AEO light. In the collections are also letters from Thomas Edison, an original copy of the Tri-Ergon patents, and an internal document from Fox Films written in the 1930s. This latter document says that once it became public knowledge that Sponable perfected the variable-area system of sound-on-film at the Fox Studios, that system became the standard and replaced the inventions of Case Research Lab.

A number of films owned by Case Research Lab and Museum and restored by George Eastman House in Rochester, New York, are in the collections of both of those institutions. The Case Research Lab and Museum has additional sound-film footage of Theodore Case, and recently discovered copies of the same films at the Eastman House, are in a much higher state of preservation. Movietone News films are in the collections of 20th-Century Fox and the University of South Carolina at Columbia, including the only known footage of Earl I. Sponable talking. Sponable can also be seen in footage of the premiere of the film The Robe.

Phonofilms that were produced using Case Research Lab inventions are in the collections of the Library of Congress and the British Film Institute.

Variable density (VD) recording systems developed from Movietone gradually lost market share to variable area (VA) ones developed from Photophone from the 1940s onwards, a process that gathered pace as VA-related patents expired.  Though both methods are theoretically capable of achieving similar standards of recording, duplication and reproduction, quality control in the lab proved to be far more critical in the duplication of VD tracks than VA ones: slight errors in printer light settings and sensitometry and densitometry control will affect the signal-to-noise ratio far more on a VD track than on a VA one.  For this reason archives have tended to remaster original VD tracks to VA negatives for preservation and the creation of new prints.

See also

Phonofilm
Vitaphone
RCA Photophone
Photokinema
Movietone News
Joseph Tykociński-Tykociner
Eric Tigerstedt
Sound film
Movie projector
Sound-on-disc
List of film formats

References

External links
List of Early Sound Films 1894–1929 at Silent Era website

Film sound production
Film and video technology
History of film
Motion picture film formats